Queen Creek Bridge may refer to:

Old Queen Creek Bridge, listed on the National Register of Historic Places in Pinal County, Arizona
Queen Creek Bridge (Florence Junction, Arizona), listed on the National Register of Historic Places in Pinal County, Arizona
Queen Creek Viaduct, which carries U.S. Route 60 over Queen Creek just outside of Superior, Arizona.